The Freudenberg Group is a German family-owned diversified group of companies whose products include housewares and cleaning products, automobile parts, textiles, building materials, and telecommunications. Its headquarters are in Weinheim, Baden-Württemberg, and it has production facilities in Europe, Asia, Australia, South and North America. The parent company was founded in 1849 as a producer of leather goods. Currently the company is owned by stock holders who are all descendants of the original founder, most of which are now affluent families that live in primarily Europe or North America.

History
The company was founded in 1849 by Carl Johann Freudenberg, the son of a wine merchant, and his partner, Heinrich Christoph Heintze; the two took over a tannery at Weinheim. For the next 80 years, the company produced leather products exclusively. Hurt by the worldwide economic depression that began in 1929, and by shortages during World War II, it diversified into seals for motors made first of leather and later of artificial rubber (the Simmerring, named for an engineer called Walther Simmer), which led to fabrics and to cleaning fabrics and tools when it was noted that the company's cleaning ladies were using discarded scraps of the experimental fabrics.

In the mid-1990s the company reorganized with a "highly decentralized organizational structure": it has 16 divisions or areas of business incorporating 430 independent units. Three-quarters of its business is as a supplier to other companies. In 2004 Freudenberg had employees in 43 countries. Recently it has focused attention on markets in China and Japan; for example, it provided the floor coverings for the Shanghai Metro stations.

In 2002 the company closed its last leather tannery, marking the effective end of the leather industry in Germany. However, today Vileda is a market leader in Europe. All German cars contain parts made by another Freudenberg subsidiary, and German-made outdoor clothing contains fibers made by yet another. Almost all major airports have flooring made by another Freudenberg subsidiary. In 2004, Freudenberg Group made an initial entry into the global medical market with the creation of Freudenberg Medical EN.

Ownership and philosophy
Freudenberg remains a family-owned private company, structured as a Kommanditgesellschaft (limited partnership) jointly held by descendants of the founder (some 300 in 2011). Stock cannot be sold to non-family members and must be surrendered by in-laws upon divorce. No stockholder holds more than 2% ownership. An annual three-day General Meeting elects the Board of Partners, which consists of 7 to 13 members of whom the majority must be Freudenberg family members. The divisions are managed by a Management Board, who need not be family members. Stockholders receive a semi-annual family newsletter and have access to an owners' intranet. A select few are on the Wine Commission, which oversees the private Freudenberg vineyards. These vineyards are the largest in the Bergstraße region, producing 60,000 bottles of wine annually.

Wolfram Freudenberg, a fifth-generation family member who formerly headed the Stuttgart Stock Exchange, was Chairman of the Board of Partners from 2005 to 2014, succeeding Reinhart Freudenberg, who stepped down for reasons of age. In 2014 he was succeeded by Martin Wentzler, also a fifth-generation family member. Since July 2012, Mohsen Sohi has been spokesperson for the Management Board; his predecessor, Peter Bettermann, formerly head of German BP, in 1997 became the first non-family member to run the company.

In the late 1930s, the company developed operating principles that include broad diversification in both products and markets, spreading of risk, long-term thinking and the maintenance of an equity ratio of at least 40%, and avoidance of large acquisitions while favoring small ones. The company would rather acquire "a handful of interesting smaller enterprises" every year than a large company that might endanger the company philosophy. In each area of activity, the company operates only where it can be first or second in the market; for example, it sells motor seals worldwide but Vileda mops mostly in Europe.

Brands

Brands listed on the company's website are:
 Chem-Trend
 Corteco
 EagleBurgmann
 evolon
 Ecozero
 FIT (Freudenberg IT)
 Freudenberg Medical
 Freudenberg Sealing Technologies
 Gala 
 HelixMark
 Klüber Lubrication
 Lutradur
 Lutraflor
 Lutrasil
 Merkel
 MicronAir
 OKS
 Pellon
 Simrit
 Terbond
 Texbond
 SoundTex
 SurTec
 Vibracoustic
 Vildona
 Vileda
 Viledon
 Vilene
 Vilmed

Freudenberg Household Products Division also sells products under the O-Cedar brand name in the US.

Philanthropy
The Freudenberg Group owns the Schau- und Sichtungsgarten Hermannshof, a public botanical garden in Weinheim, which opened in 1983 and is jointly operated with the town.

The Freudenberg Stiftung was founded in 1984 and is endowed with stock in the parent company. It has a broad mandate "to promote science, the humanities and education as well as strengthening peaceful coexistence in society and culture" and focuses particularly on assistance to and democratic education of young people, primarily in Germany.

References

Further reading
 Carl Freudenberg. 150 Years of Freudenberg: How a Family Enterprise Developed from a Tannery into an Internationally Diversified Enterprise. [Mannheim]: Freudenberg, 1999. 
 Pia Gerber. Der lange Weg der sozialen Innovation—wie Stiftungen zum sozialen Wandel im Feld der Bildungs- und Sozialpolitik beitragen können: eine Fallstudie zur Innovationskraft der Freudenberg Stiftung / The Long March of Social Innovation—How Charitable Foundations can Contribute Towards Social Change in the Fields of Education and Social Policy: A Case Study on the Innovative Vigor of the Freudenberg Foundation. Opusculum 21. Berlin: Maecenata-Institut für Philanthropie und Zivilgesellschaft, November 2006.  Google preview

External links
 Official site in English

Manufacturing companies of Germany
Companies established in 1849
Companies based in Baden-Württemberg
Conglomerate companies of Germany
Weinheim
1849 establishments in Baden